The 2021 UK Music Video Awards were held on 4 November 2021, at the Roundhouse in London to recognise the best in music videos and music film making from United Kingdom and worldwide, unlike last year's ceremony, the ceremony for this year is expected to be live.

The nominations were announced on 29 September 2021, a new category named Best Performance in a Video was included while the category Best Styling in a Video was split into and Best Hair & Make-up in a Video and Best Wardrobe Styling in a Video. British rapper Little Simz led the nominations with five, followed by Skrillex, Starrah & Four Tet with four each, all for their collaboration "Butterflies".

Electronic music duo Duck Sauce won Video of the Year for "Mesmerize", directed by Keith Schofield. Producer Juliette Larthe received the Outstanding Achievement Award.

Video of the Year

Video Genre Categories

Craft and Technical Categories

Special Video Categories

Individual and Company Categories

References

External links
Official website

UK Music Video Awards
British music awards
UK Music Video Awards
UK Music Video Awards
UK Music Video Awards